Bala Mahalleh-ye Gildeh (also Romanized as Bālā Maḩalleh-ye Gīldeh; also known as Gīldeh) is a village in Dehgah Rural District, Kiashahr District, Astaneh-ye Ashrafiyeh County, Gilan Province, Iran. At the 2006 census, its population was 425, in 141 families.

References 

Populated places in Astaneh-ye Ashrafiyeh County